Little Long Pond is a  pond in Wareham and Plymouth, Massachusetts. The pond is located east of the southeasternmost point of Myles Standish State Forest within Camp Cachalot, southeast of Charge Pond, southwest of Five Mile Pond, and south of Abner Pond.

There is another Little Long Pond entirely within Plymouth's borders located north of Long Pond and Gallows Pond.

External links
Environmental Protection Agency

Wareham, Massachusetts
Ponds of Plymouth, Massachusetts
Ponds of Massachusetts